Kristine Rolofson (born December 9, 1951, in Rhode Island, U.S.) is a popular American writer of over 35 romance novels since 1987.

Biography
Rolofson grew up reading books by Zane Grey. At age 18 she married her high school history teacher and had six children.

For years, she ran the Rolofson's Gift Shop, until Mount St. Helens' volcano blew, scattering ash across the northwest and preventing tourists from visiting the gift shop. To occupy her time, she read 200 Harlequin romances and began writing her own novel.

For 12 years, the Rolofsons lived in the mountains of North Idaho before moving to New England in 1987, the year her first novel was published. For years she combined writing with other jobs as waitress, wallpaper hanger, secretary, and seamstress. Now, she writes full-time and loves to travel.

Bibliography

Single novels
One of the Family (1987)
Stuck on You (1989)
Bound for Bliss ng muntinlupa (1990)
The Last Great Affair (1991)
All That Glitters (1992)
The Perfect Husband (1992)
Baby Blues (1994)
Plain Jane's Man (1994)
Madeleine's Cowboy (1994)
I'll Be Seeing You (1994)
Jessie's Lawman (1995)
The Cowboy (1995)
Make-Believe Honeymoon (1995)
The Texan Takes a Wife (1996)
A Touch of Texas (1997)
Billy and the Kid (2000)
A Montana Christmas (2002)

Born in the United States Series Multi-Author
Somebody's Hero (1990)

Boots and booties Series
The Last Man in Montana (1996)
The Only Man in Wyoming (1997)
The Next Man in Texas (1997)
The Wrong Man in Wyoming (1998)
The Right Man in Montana (1998)
The Best Man in Texas (2004)
Made in Texas (2004)
Boots and Booties (Omnibus) (2000)
Brides, Boots and Booties (Omnibus) (2001)

Lets Celebrate Series
Pillow Talk (1997)

Brides On The Run Series
The Bride Rode West (1997)

Boots And Beauties Series
Blame It on Cowboys (2000)
Blame It on Babies (2001)
Blame It on Texas (2001)

Montana Matchmakers Series
A Wife for Owen Chase (2001)
A Bride for Calder Brown (2001)
A Man for Maggie Moore (2001)

Cooper's Corner Series Multi-Author
The Baby and the Bachelor (2002)

Collections
Lap of Luxury: The Perfect Husband / Stuck On You / Make-believe Honeymoon (2002)

Omnibus in collaboration
Millennium Baby (1999) (with Judith Arnold and Bobby Hutchinson)
Tyler Brides (2001) (with Jacqueline Diamond and Heather MacAllister)
Meant to Be (2001) (with Barbara Delinsky and Jayne Ann Krentz)
A Wedding at Cooper's Corner (2002) (with Bobby Hutchinson and Muriel Jensen)
Date with Destiny (2003) (with Kristin Gabriel and Muriel Jensen) (Stop the Wedding! / Oh, Baby! / A Night to Remember)
The Truth about Cats and Dogs (2004) (with Caroline Burnes and Lori Foster) (Tailspin / Secondhand Sam / Familiar Pursuit)
Wilde for You / Best Man in Texas (2004) (with Dawn Atkins)
Baby, it's Cold Outside / Family Doctor / Baby Gift (2004) (with Bethany Campbell and Bobby Hutchinson)
Summer Temptations (2004) (with Lori Foster)
Made in Texas / We've Got Tonight (2005) (with Jacquie D'Alessandro)
Christmas Carol / Montana Christmas (2005) (with Kathleen O'Reilly)

References and sources
Harlequin Enterprises Ltd's Website

External links
Kristine Rolofson's Webpage in Fantastic Fiction's Website

1975 births
20th-century American novelists
21st-century American novelists
American romantic fiction writers
Living people
American women novelists
Women romantic fiction writers
20th-century American women writers
21st-century American women writers